Leslie King (6 March 1950 – 28 October 2009) was a Trinidadian cyclist. He competed at the 1968 Summer Olympics and the 1972 Summer Olympics.

References

1950 births
2009 deaths
Trinidad and Tobago male cyclists
Olympic cyclists of Trinidad and Tobago
Cyclists at the 1968 Summer Olympics
Cyclists at the 1972 Summer Olympics
Commonwealth Games medallists in cycling
Commonwealth Games silver medallists for Trinidad and Tobago
Commonwealth Games bronze medallists for Trinidad and Tobago
Cyclists at the 1970 British Commonwealth Games
Pan American Games medalists in cycling
Pan American Games gold medalists for Trinidad and Tobago
Pan American Games silver medalists for Trinidad and Tobago
Cyclists at the 1971 Pan American Games
20th-century Trinidad and Tobago people
Medallists at the 1970 British Commonwealth Games